Hugo Segundo Alfredo Castillo Arteaga (born July 28, 1978) is a Peruvian footballer who plays as a defensive midfielder. He currently plays for Sport Áncash in the Peruvian Segunda División.

Club career
He made his official debut in the Peruvian First Division in Round 1 of the 2009 season against Sporting Cristal. He made his debut in the Max Augustín Stadium and lasted the entire match, which finished in a scoreless draw. In Round 8 that same season Castillo scored his first goal in the Peruvian First Division at home against Inti Gas Deportes. He scored his goal in the 90th minute of the match from a free kick, which resulted in a 1–0 win for his club.

References

External links

1978 births
Living people
People from Junín Region
Association football midfielders
Peruvian footballers
Colegio Nacional Iquitos footballers
Sport Áncash footballers